The Togo national under-20 football team are the feeder team for the Togo national football team. They are controlled by Togolese Football Federation.

African Youth Championship
1979 - Round 1 (knocked out by Guinea)
1981 - Round 1 (Knocked out by Cameroon)
1991 - Round 2 (Knocked out by Algeria)
2003 - Round 2 (Knocked out by Gabon)
2011 - Preliminary Round (Knocked out by Guinea)

FIFA U-20 World Cup
1987 - Qualified For Finals (Got knocked out in the Group Stage)

Togo national football team
African national under-20 association football teams